Othman El Kabir (born 17 July 1991) is a Dutch footballer of Moroccan descent who plays as a left midfielder.

Club career

Djurgårdens IF
El Kabir signed a 3 and a half year deal with Swedish top tier Djurgårdens IF on 14 July 2016. On 24 August El Kabir scored his first goals for Djurgården, scoring two goals in the Swedish Cup qualifier 5-1 win against Smedby AIS.

On 19 February 2018 El Kabir signed with Ural Yekaterinburg. He left Ural on 30 June 2021.

Personal life
Othman El Kabir is the younger brother of Moestafa El Kabir.

Career statistics

References

External links
Djurgården profile

Living people
Footballers from Amsterdam
1991 births
Dutch footballers
Dutch sportspeople of Moroccan descent
Dutch expatriate footballers
Association football midfielders
Djurgårdens IF Fotboll players
Allsvenskan players
Superettan players
Expatriate footballers in Sweden
FC Ural Yekaterinburg players
Expatriate footballers in Russia
Russian Premier League players